The Nanjing Biennale is a contemporary art exhibition held every two years in the city of Nanjing, in Jiangsu province in China. On October 28, 2010. it opened for the first time as an international event, co-hosted by Jiangsu Provincial Art Museum and Endless Contemporary Art Space. The curatorial team of the 2010 edition consisted of Zhu Tong, museum director and curator at Nanjing 4Cube Museum of Contemporary Art, Won-il Rhee and Eleonora Battiston. The theme of the 2010 biennial at Jiangsu Provincial Art Museum was "And_Writers".

References

External links
 Nanjing Biennale – description (archived link, September 28, 2010)
 From Shanghai to Nanjing – Two International Biennales and the In-Betweens Asia Art Archive (AAA), December 2010

Art biennials